Rain Weekend is the second studio album by King Creosote, released in 1998.

Track listing
Lonesome Pigeon 
Oh No, It's Him! 
Turps 
 My F.A.B. Tattoo 
Injecticide 
Crazy Paving 
You Won't Regret It  
Had I Been Around 
If Ever 
Try Again 
Marigolden Growth 
All Over Caroline 
Wood Louse
Inner Crail to Outer Space

1998 albums
King Creosote albums